Joris Ipézé Gorendiawé (born 18 July 1990) in New Caledonia is a footballer who plays as a midfielder. He currently plays for AS Magenta in the New Caledonia Division Honneur and the New Caledonia national football team.

References

1990 births
Living people
New Caledonian footballers
New Caledonia international footballers
Association football midfielders
AS Magenta players
Hienghène Sport players